The Ateneo Blue Eagles (formerly Ateneo Lady Blue Booters) is the varsity women's football team of the Ateneo de Manila University. They compete at the University Athletic Association of the Philippines (UAAP). They also played in PFF Women's League, the top flight domestic women's football league in the Philippines.

2016 quad

Officials
As of 3 December 2016

References

Ateneo de Manila University
University Athletic Association of the Philippines football teams
Women's football clubs in the Philippines
PFF Women's League clubs